is the sequel to 'Tottoko Hamutaro: Hamu Hamu Paradichu!. The series revolves around the 15 original Ham-Hams in short 5-minute episodes. The Hai! series is animated differently from the original series, most notably, the head-to-body ratio is off, and it is also computer-generated in 3-D. It has never been aired in English, but has aired in Italian under the title of Hi! Hamtaro: Piccoli Criceti Grandi Avventure, in Mandarin under the same name as the original series, Hamutailang (Hamtaro), as well as in Thai and Korean, and in Indonesian under "Hi! Hamtaro: Little Hamsters, Big Adventures (its official English name) . There is a video game called Tottoko Hamutaro Hai!: Hamu Hamu Challenge! Atsumare Hai! in allusion to the series, which is called "Hi! Hamtaro: Ham-Ham Challenge" in English to reflect the show's official English name.

List of episodes

References

Tottoko Hamutaro Hai